Stephen Arthur Jennings (May 11, 1915 – February 2, 1979) was a mathematician who made contributions to the study of modular representation theory .  His advisor was Richard Brauer, and his student Rimhak Ree discovered two infinite series of finite simple groups known as the Ree groups.  Jennings was an editor of Mathematics Magazine and an acting president of the University of Victoria.

Biography
Stephen was born in Walthamstow, England and immigrated to Canada with his family in 1928.  He had been receiving scholarships in England and these were transferred to Canada.   He finished his high school education in Toronto and in September 1932 he went to University College in Toronto.   In 1939 he received his PHD from the University of Toronto.   He married Dorothy Freeda Rintoul (University of Western University - B.A. and University of Toronto M.A. Psychology) in 1939.  On November 14, 1942 he became a Member of the Zeta Psi fraternity.  When he was made a professor, he was the youngest professor ever appointed in Canada. In 1944 Stephen was appointed 2nd Lieutenant (Paymaster) in Canadian Army.   While in Vancouver, teaching at the University of British Columbia, Stephen and Dorothy established their family,  two children, Judith Anne Jennings and James Stephen Jennings.  Stephen was Dean of Graduate Studies  at the University of Victoria and the Head of the Mathematics Department there.

Selected bibliography

External links 
 

1915 births
1979 deaths
20th-century Canadian mathematicians
Group theorists
Academic staff of the University of Victoria
University of Toronto alumni
English emigrants to Canada
People from Walthamstow